Liu Yingzi (born 27 January 1971 in Xiangyin, Yueyang, Hunan) is a female Chinese sports shooter, who competed for Team China at the 2008 and 2012 Summer Olympics.

Major performances

1997/2001 National Games - 2nd double trap;
2005 World Cup - 2nd double trap;
2007 World Cup Final -3rd double trap;
2007 World Championships - 1st double trap

References
 http://2008teamchina.olympic.cn/index.php/personview/personsen/4934

1971 births
Living people
Olympic shooters of China
People from Yueyang
Shooters at the 2008 Summer Olympics
Shooters at the 2012 Summer Olympics
Trap and double trap shooters
Asian Games medalists in shooting
Sport shooters from Hunan
Shooters at the 1994 Asian Games
Shooters at the 2010 Asian Games
Chinese female sport shooters
Asian Games gold medalists for China
Asian Games bronze medalists for China
Medalists at the 2010 Asian Games